Kenneth Darrell Austin (born November 16, 1951) is a former professional American football offensive lineman in the National Football League. He was drafted by the Denver Broncos in the 16th round (404th overall) in the 1974 NFL draft. He played eight seasons for the New York Jets and the Tampa Bay Buccaneers.

References

1951 births
Living people
People from Union, South Carolina
Players of American football from South Carolina
American football offensive guards
American football centers
American football offensive tackles
South Carolina Gamecocks football players
New York Jets players
Tampa Bay Buccaneers players